Krasny is a rural locality (a settlement) in Kuybyshevskoye Rural Settlement, Sredneakhtubinsky District, Volgograd Oblast, Russia. The population was 67 as of 2010. There are 14 streets.

Geography 
Krasny is located 13 km southwest of Srednyaya Akhtuba (the district's administrative centre) by road. Nevidimka is the nearest rural locality.

References 

Rural localities in Sredneakhtubinsky District